Graton may refer to:

Graton, California, an unincorporated town in Sonoma County
Graton Rancheria, a former federal land holding
Graton Resort & Casino, Sonoma County
Françoise Graton (1930–2014), Québécoise actress
Jean Graton (1923–2021), French comics author
Studio Graton, his drawing studio
Graton éditeur, his publishing house
Louis Caryl Graton (1880–1970), American geologist

See also
 Gratton (disambiguation)